Nordic Shooting Region (NSR), established in 1921, is a union of some of the shooting associations from Denmark, Finland, Great Britain, Iceland, Norway and Sweden. NSR hosts Nordic championships for some of the ISSF disciplines within pistol, rifle, clay shooting and running target, in addition to some own Nordic disciplines. The member associations are:

 Danish Shooting Union (DSkyU)
 Finnish Shooting Sport Federation
 British Shooting (formerly Great Britain Target Shooting Federation)
 Icelandic Shooting Sports Federation (Skotiprottasamband Islands)
 Norwegian Shooting Association
 Swedish Shooting Sport Federation

References

External links 
 Nordic Shooting Region

Shooting sports organizations